Senator Griego may refer to:

Eric Griego (born 1966), New Mexico State Senate
Phil Griego (born 1948), New Mexico State Senate